Walter Davis Jr. (September 2, 1932 – June 2, 1990) was an American bebop and hard bop pianist.

Davis once left the music world to be a tailor, but returned. A soloist, bandleader, and accompanist, he amassed a body of work while never becoming a high-profile name even within the jazz community. Davis played with Babs Gonzales' Three Bips & a Bop as a teen, then moved from Richmond to New York in the early 1950s. He played with Max Roach and Charlie Parker, recording with Roach in 1953.

He joined Dizzy Gillespie's band in 1956, and toured the Middle East and South America. He also played in Paris with Donald Byrd in 1958 and with Art Blakey & the Jazz Messengers in 1959.

After retiring from music for a while to run his tailor shop, Davis returned in the 1960s, producing records and writing arrangements for a local New Jersey group. He studied music in India in 1979, and played with Sonny Rollins in the early 1970s.

Biography

Born in Richmond, Virginia, Davis performed as a teenager with Babs Gonzales. In the 1950s, Davis recorded with Melba Liston and Max Roach. He played with Roach, Charlie Parker, and Dizzy Gillespie. In 1958, he played with trumpeter Donald Byrd at Le Chat Qui Pêche in Paris and shortly after realized his dream of becoming pianist and composer-arranger for Art Blakey's Jazz Messengers. Davis married songwriter Mayme Watts, who was performing as a vocalist with the Walter Davis Jr. Trio.

After retiring from music in the 1960s to work as a tailor, painter, and designer, he returned in the 1970s to perform with Sonny Rollins and again with the Jazz Messengers. He recorded with many other prominent jazz musicians, including Kenny Clarke, Sonny Criss, Jackie McLean, Pierre Michelot and Archie Shepp.

Davis was known as an interpreter of the music of Bud Powell, but also recorded an album capturing the compositional and piano style of Thelonious Monk. Several of his compositions served as titles for albums by Blakey's Jazz Messengers. Combining traditional harmonies with modal patterns and featuring numerous rhythmic shifts along with internal melodic motifs within operatic, aria-like sweeping melodies, Davis's compositions included "Scorpio Rising", "Backgammon", "Uranus", "Gypsy Folk Tales", "Jodi", and "Ronnie Is a Dynamite Lady".

Davis had an occasional role as the piano player on the CBS television comedy Frank's Place. He also contributed to the soundtrack of the Clint Eastwood film Bird (1988).

Death
Davis died in New York City on June 2, 1990, aged 57, from complications of liver and kidney disease.

Discography

As leader

As sideman
With Art Blakey
 Africaine (Blue Note, 1959)
 Paris Jam Session (Fontana, 1961)
 Roots & Herbs (Blue Note, 1961)
 Gypsy Folk Tales (Roulette, 1977)
With Nick Brignola
Burn Brigade (Bee Hive, 1979)
With Donald Byrd
 Byrd in Hand (Blue Note, 1959)
With Sonny Criss
 This is Criss! (Prestige, 1966)
 Portrait of Sonny Criss (Prestige, 1967)
With Walt Dickerson
 Walt Dickerson Plays Unity (Audio Fidelity, 1964)
With Teddy Edwards
 Nothin' But the Truth! (Prestige, 1966)
With Dizzy Gillespie
 World Statesman (Norgran, 1956)
 Dizzy in Greece (Verve, 1957)
With Slide Hampton
 Explosion! The Sound of Slide Hampton (Atlantic, 1962)
With Etta Jones
Ms. Jones to You (Muse, 1976)
With Philly Joe Jones
 Philly Joe's Beat (Atlantic, 1960)
To Tadd with Love (Uptown, 1982) with Dameronia
 Look Stop Listen (Uptown, 1983) with Dameronia
With Jackie McLean
 New Soil (Blue Note, 1959)
 Let Freedom Ring (Blue Note, 1962)
With Hank Mobley
 Newark 1953 (Uptown, 1953 [2012])
With Max Roach
 The Max Roach Quartet featuring Hank Mobley (Debut, 1954)
With Julian Priester
 Spiritsville (Jazzland, 1960)
With Sonny Rollins
 Horn Culture (Milestone, 1973)
With Charlie Rouse
Soul Mates (Uptown, 1988 [1993]) featuring Sahib Shihab
With Art Taylor
 Taylor's Tenors (Prestige, 1959)

References

External links

 An Interview with Walter Davis, Jr., by Bob Rosenbaum, January 1982

1932 births
1990 deaths
Musicians from Richmond, Virginia
Hard bop pianists
African-American pianists
American jazz pianists
American male pianists
20th-century American pianists
Jazz musicians from Virginia
20th-century American male musicians
American male jazz musicians
Dameronia members
Mapleshade Records artists
20th-century African-American musicians